The M.T. Abraham Foundation is a non-profit art institution, which is part of the Israeli M.T. Abraham Group. Its headquarters are in Paris, France, and its collections are stored in Geneva, Switzerland. It was founded by the descendants of Mansur Tamir Abraham after his death in 1999. Its stated intent is promoting public appreciation for Russian and European Modernism, Impressionism, and Modern Art by collecting pieces that can be loaned "for the sole purpose of display and study by public institutions."

The core of the collection focusing on European and Russian Modernism of the late 19th and 20th centuries. Through its publishing department, the foundation promotes, publicizes and facilitates investigation related to its permanent collection. Also, it supports debates on the "artistic phenomena" that shape the plastic arts from the 19th to the 21st centuries by publishing different editorial possibilities.

In June 2019 the foundation pledged a donation from its collection to the State Hermitage Museum in Russia valued at 7m USD, this donation consists of paintings and sculptures by the Russian artist Vladimir Sterligov, and the French impressionist, Edgar Degas.

History

The organization was first founded in 2004 by the family of Mansur Tamir Abraham. M.T. Abraham (born April 27, 1912) was a native of Aden, Yemen when it was occupied by the British. He became a legal authority on African and Asian rule of law. Abraham died on January 9, 1999, at the age of 86.

In 2004 his children and grandchildren formed the collections into the M.T. Abraham Foundation, a non-profit organization. The current chairman is Isaac Tamir. It is based in Geneva, Switzerland, with head offices in Paris, France.

Mission

Exhibitions
The foundation's stated mission is promoting public appreciation for Russian and European Modernism, Impressionism, and Modern Art by collecting pieces "for the sole purpose of display and study by public institutions." It has a loan program through which it makes works available for public exhibition at accredited institutions, including museums that ordinarily wouldn't have the means to organize such exhibits.

Education
Its educational mission is fostering "exhibitions that will encourage an appreciation and understanding of art, its history, context and meaning." Exhibitions sponsored by the center are accompanied by educational programs for children and young adults, which are held by artists, educators, and other art professionals. The foundation also provides support for young artists and students in Judaic studies.

Scholarship
The foundation supports promising young artists and students in all fields of art history, aesthetics and Judaic studies.

Publishing

Through its publishing department, the foundation invests maximum efforts to promote, publicize and facilitate investigation related to its permanent collection. Also, it supports debates on the artistic phenomena that shape the plastic arts from the 19th to the 21st centuries by publishing different editorial possibilities. In 2013 the foundation's publishing department published “selling Russia’s treasures”, the story of the sale of Russian national art treasures confiscated from the tsarist royal family, the church, private individuals and museums in the Soviet Union.

The Foundation published the book White City - Bauhaus Architecture in Tel Aviv, which presents Tel Aviv's Bauhaus architectural heritage at the State Hermitage Museum. At the same year the Foundation published the book Lissitzky - Kabakov, Utopia and Reality at the Hermitage Museum.

As part of "Tel Aviv days in St. Petersburg", a cultural event led by the Israeli General Consulate in St. Petersburg and the Israeli Ministry of Foreign Affairs, the foundation supported the events and helped organize an international exhibition titled "White City - Bauhaus Architecture in Tel Aviv," which portrays the city's urban and architectural heritage at the State Hermitage Museum.

They published White City – Bauhaus Architecture in Tel Aviv. The same year they released Lissitzky – Kabakov, Utopia and Reality at the Hermitage Museum and at the Multimedia Art Museum in Moscow.

As part of the State Hermitage Museum exhibition “Edgar Degas - Figures in Motion]”, a scholarly catalogue was published.

Collections
A large part of the collection consists of paintings by Eastern and Western European artists. The core of the collection focuses on European and Russian Modernism of the late 19th and 20th centuries. Genres covered by this period included Impressionism, Post-Impressionism, Constructivism, Cubism, Cubo-Futurism, Neo-Primitivism, Rayonism, Suprematism, and Futurism.

European Impressionism

The foundation owns a complete collection of 74 bronze sculptures by the French Impressionist Edgar Degas, including a casting of "The Little Dancer Aged Fourteen." According to a number of experts, Degas, after meeting with criticism for his first sculpture "Little Dancer," had privately accumulated plasters for sculptures that were not found until after his death. They feature dancers, horses, bathers, etc. Apart from the M.T. Abraham Foundation, as of 2010 only four museums worldwide have near-complete collections.

In November 2009 the foundation began touring the collection under the name "The Complete Sculptures of Edgar Degas." It first spent five months at the Herakleidon Museum in Athens, marking the first time the sculptures were exhibited in Greece. By March 2010 the sculptures moved to the Tel Aviv Art Museum in Israel. In September 2010 the exhibition opened for two months at the National Art Gallery in Sofia, Bulgaria. It also appeared at the Instituto Valenciano de Arte Moderno. All the exhibitions were supported by the French Institute and the local French embassies. Workshops for children always accompanied the exhibitions. The complete set of Edgar Degas worldwide exhibition tour supported by the Institut de France.

In December 2013, the State Hermitage Museum presented an exhibition “Edgar Degas - Figures in Motion”, to highlight the importance of the bronze sculptures of Edgar Degas and place them in the proper historical context of modern masterpieces. The entire collection of 74 bronze sculptures are on loan to the museum for two years, courtesy of the M.T. Abraham Foundation.

Conference
In May 2012, the foundation lent several Degas bronzes to an exhibition of posthumous bronzes linked to an International colloquium titled "Posthumous bronze in law and art history" held at the State Hermitage Museum in St. Petersburg, Russia.

The subject of debate was 20th century bronze casts by Edgar Degas, Pierre-Auguste Renoir, Auguste Rodin, Constantin Brâncuși, Alexander Archipenko, Salvador Dalí, and other artists. The colloquium examined the legal and artistic problems surrounding what are termed posthumous bronzes - cast bronze sculptures made after the artisan's death. According to State Hermitage Museum General Director Mikhail Piotrovsky, "The world is full of bronze sculptures by famous artists which have been made either with or without the approval of their heirs. This all creates serious problems in the art market, confusing prices. Exhibitions are held of copies which pretend to be cultural events." The views and conclusions of the conference was published in December 2012.

Conferences
The foundation took part in International Competition “Worlds of El Lissitzky”, an architectural concept of the symbolic object of Novosibirsk city environment dedicated to Russian Avant-garde. Organizers of the Competition Siberian Center for Contemporary Art.

Gallery

References

External links

Non-profit organizations based in France
Art collections in Switzerland